The 1978 Speedway World Team Cup was the 19th edition of the FIM Speedway World Team Cup to determine the team world champions.

The final took place at the Ellermühle Speedway Stadium in Landshut, West Germany. Denmark won their first title defeating defending champions England, who finished in second place.

Qualification

Round 1
 May 21
  Reading, Reading Stadium
 Referee:  A. Humphrey

* England and Australia to Intercontinental Final

Round 2
 June 4
  Tampere, Tampere Stadium
 Att: 2,000

* Denmark and Sweden to Intercontinental Final

Round 3
 May 21
  Wiener Neustadt

* West Germany and Italy to Continental Semifinal

Round 4
 May 21
  Prelog

* Soviet Union and Nederlands to Continental Semifinal

Tournament

Continental Semifinal
 July 17
  Abensberg, Abensberg Stadion
 Att: 18,000

* Soviet Union and West Germany to Continental Final

Continental Final
 July 29
  Leningrad

* Poland and Czechoslovakia to Final

Intercontinental Final
 June 18
  Manchester, Hyde Road
 Referee:  Tore Kittilsen

* England and Denmark to Final

World Final
 September 16
  Landshut, Stadion Ellermühle
 Referee:  Tore Kittilsen
 Att: 7,000

See also
 1978 Individual Speedway World Championship
 1978 Speedway World Pairs Championship

References

1978
World T